Persecution of Heathens can refer to:

Christianization
Decline of Hellenistic polytheism
Persecution of pagans in the late Roman Empire
Persecution of Germanic Pagans (disambiguation)
Religious discrimination against Neopagans
contemporary traditional religions
Persecution of African traditional religions
Kalash people#History

 

Persecution of Pagans